Haidar Salim is an Afghan singer who resides in Dublin, California. He gained popularity in the 1970s and has maintained popularity throughout the decades. He has had further success with "Ghazal", a song from his new album.
He is brothers with Salma Jahani, a brother-in-law to Rahim Jahani and also the cousin of Ahmad Wali.

Popular CD's
 Sorood-e Kabul
 Pay- Ashk
 Taqdeer
 Sapidah
 Dukhtar-e Afghan
 Nawa-e Dil
 Majlisi Awal
 Maykadah
 Majlisi Dawoom

Popular songs performed in concerts
 Salma
 Mastee
 Kabul
 Zeba

References

External links
Haider Salim’s official website
Haider Salim’s Videos on AfghanEntertainment.tv

Living people
Pashtun people
20th-century Afghan male singers
People from Dublin, California
Afghan emigrants to the United States
Musicians from the San Francisco Bay Area
Year of birth missing (living people)